Milinkovic-Savić is a Serbian surname.

Sergej Milinković-Savić (born 1995), Serbian footballer, playing for S.S. Lazio
Vanja Milinković-Savić (born 1997), Serbian footballer, playing for Torino F.C.

Serbian surnames
Compound surnames